Finland was represented by the band Boulevard, with the song "Nauravat silmät muistetaan", at the 1988 Eurovision Song Contest, which took place on 30 April in Dublin.

Before Eurovision

National final 
The final was held 13 February 1988 at the Kulttuuritalo in Helsinki, hosted by Sini Sovijärvi. Twelve songs took part with the winner chosen by voting from six regional juries. Other participants included former Finnish representatives Ami Aspelund (1983) and Sonja Lumme (1985). Two of the songs, Helena Miller's "Svart och vitt" and Benny Törnroos's "I november", was written in Swedish, that is a national language in Finland as well. The other 10 songs was written in Finnish.

At Eurovision 
On the night of the final Boulevard performed third in the running order, following Sweden and preceding the United Kingdom. The band had to deal with a technical malfunction when the backing track temporarily faded out halfway through the song. At the close of voting "Nauravat silmät muistetaan" had received only 3 points, placing Finland 20th of the 21 entries, ahead only of the nul-points song from Austria. The Finnish jury awarded its 12 points to Luxembourg. Among the members of the Finnish jury was Ilpo Hakasalo.

Voting

References

External links
 Full national final on Yle Elävä Arkisto

1988
Countries in the Eurovision Song Contest 1988
Eurovision